"Mairi's Wedding" (also known as Marie's Wedding, the Lewis Bridal Song, or  "Blond Mary") is a Scottish folk song originally written in Gaelic by John Roderick Bannerman (1865–1938) for Mary C. MacNiven (1905–1997) on the occasion of her winning the gold medal at the National Mòd in 1934.
In 1959, James B. Cosh devised a Scottish country dance to the tune, which is 40 bars, in reel time.

Origins

J. R. Bannerman, who composed the original song, was born in South Uist but left aged seven for Glasgow, where he later joined the General Post Office (GPO) as a telegraph boy and rose to become general superintendent. He was brought up in the Glasgow Gaelic community where most social activities were conducted in Gaelic and he developed a lifelong interest in the songs and literature of that culture. His son, John MacDonald Bannerman, became a well known Gaelic broadcaster and singer, but was better known as a rugby international (37 caps for Scotland; Oxford Blue) and Liberal politician, ultimately being ennobled as John Bannerman, Baron Bannerman of Kildonan.

Winning the Mòd gold medal was (and is) regarded as the highest singing award in Scottish Gaeldom, and "Mairi's Wedding" was composed to recognise this achievement. A track of Mary C. MacNiven singing her winning song at the 1934 Mòd is still available and the Mod has founded a memorial salver competition to honour her name. Her wedding did not in fact take place until some six years later when she married Captain John Campbell of Glendale, Skye. She continued to sing at Gaelic concerts and céilidhs for most of her life, and died aged 91 at her native Portnahaven, Islay in 1997.

The song "Mairi's Wedding" was first performed for her at the Highlanders' Institute, then in Glasgow's Elmbank Street, and, at that time, a focal point of cultural and social activity for the Highlands and Islands community in the city. It was probably through this performance that Sir Hugh Roberton came to know the song.

Roberton was conductor of the Glasgow Orpheus Choir, which had by the early 1930s acquired international recognition under his leadership. His knighthood in 1931, promoted by his friend Ramsay MacDonald, whose radical politics he shared, established him as the leading British choirmaster and a towering figure within the Glasgow musical world. Although the choir had a vast repertoire, Roberton had inherited a particular fondness for folk music from his mother, and in addition to writing choral arrangements of traditional songs, he composed his own.

Roberton had collaborated with John R. Bannerman on other songs destined to become internationally successful. For the song "Joy of my Heart" Roberton wrote the English lyrics and asked Bannerman to produce a Gaelic version; the tune for the "Uist Tramping Song" was written by Bannerman with the English words by Roberton. John M. Bannerman claimed that his father had written the tune for the song "Westering Home" yet this was not acknowledged in Roberton's published scores. In a London court case in 1960 Sir Hugh's executors failed to prove that he had written the tune and costs were awarded to Miss (later Dame) Vera Lynn who had recorded "Travellin' Home" to the same tune, a recording which made 20th place in the music charts.

Roberton wrote the English words for "Mairi's Wedding", which, as can be seen by the lyrics below in both languages, bore little resemblance to Bannerman's original and make no reference to the original inspiration for the song, the winning of a Mòd gold medal. He published this in 1936, giving the song the alternative title of "The Lewis Bridal Song". Roberton presented an original signed copy of his score to Mary C. MacNiven and it became one of her most prized possessions. When the song was published in Roberton's "Songs of the Isles" by J Curwen & Sons Ltd (1951), the Gaelic words did not appear. J.R. Bannerman was acknowledged as the composer of the original lyrics and tune.

Lyrics

Bannerman's Gaelic version, with a literal translation into English by Anne Lorne Gillies, is:
<blockquote>
{|
|-
|<poem>Gaol mo chridhe-sa Màiri Bhàn,Màiri bhòidheach, sgeul mo dhàin,
S i mo ghaol-sa Màiri bhàn,S tha mi dol ga pòsadh.Thuit mi ann an gaol a-raoir,
Tha mo chridh-sa shuas air beinn;
Màiri Bhàn rim thaobh a' seinn,S tha mi dol ga pòsadh.

Cuailean òir is sùilean tlàth,Mala chaol is gruaidh an àigh,Beul as binne sheinneas dàn,'''S tha mi dol ga pòsadh.S ann aig cèilidh aig a' MhòdFhuair mi eòlas air an òigh;'''S ise choisinn am bonn òir,
S tha mi dol ga pòsadh.Bidh mo ghaol do Mhàiri Bhàn
Dìleas, dùrachdach gu bràth;
Seinnidh sinn da chèil' ar gràdh,S tha mi dol ga pòsadh.</poem>
|Love of my heart, fair-haired Mary,
pretty Mary, theme of my song:
she's my darling, fair-haired Mary
and oh! I'm going to marry her.

Last night I fell in love
and now my heart is soaring high; (lit. "up on a mountain")
fair-haired Mary singing by my side
and oh! I'm going to marry her!

Golden hair and kindly eyes,
shapely brow and smiling cheeks,
sweetest voice that ever sang
and oh! I'm going to marry her.

It was at a cèilidh at the Mòd
that I got to know the girl:
she was the winner of the gold medal
and oh! I'm going to marry her.

My love for Fair-haired Mary will be
eternally faithful and heartfelt;
we'll sing together of our love
and oh! I'm going to marry her.
|-
|}
</blockquote>

Sir Hugh Roberton's  lyrics begin with the chorus:
Step we gaily, on we go,
Heel for heel and toe for toe,
Arm and arm and row on row,
All for Mairi's wedding.

Over hill-ways up and down,
Myrtle green and bracken brown,
Past the shielings, through the town;
All for sake o' Mairi.

Red her cheeks as rowans are,
Bright her eye as any star,
Fairest o' them a' by far,
Is our darling Mairi.

Plenty herring, plenty meal,
Plenty peat to fill her creel,
Plenty bonnie bairns as weel;
That's the toast for Mairi.

Recorded versions

Mairi's Wedding has been recorded by a wide variety of musicians.

 Alexander Brothers "Best of"
 Moira Anderson on "The Best of Scotland: Twenty Tracks of Traditional Scottish Music"
 Moira Anderson, "A Land for All Seasons"
 Bantry Bay, "Set the Sails"
 Van Morrison and The Chieftains, "Irish Heartbeat"
 Bobby Clancy, "Make Me a Cup"
 The Clancy Brothers, "The Boys Won't Leave The Girls Alone," "Carnegie Hall 1962," "In Person at Carnegie Hall: The Complete 1963 Concert," and "Ain't It Grand Boys"
 Billy Connolly played a comical version on the banjo in a medley with Campbell's Farewell To The Red Castle, and The Soldier's Joy (songs which he claimed his music teacher forced him and the rest of his class to "appreciate").
 The Corries, "Kishmul's Galley"
 Paul Dooley "Rip the Calico"
 Fiddler's Green, "Drive Me Mad!"
 Clive Gregson used the same tune for a song called "Mary's Divorce" on his album People & Places The High Kings, "The High Kings"
 Noel Hill, "The Irish Concertina Two"
 The King's Singers, "Annie Laurie: Folk Songs of the British Isles"
 The King's Singers, "Mairi's Wedding"
 Marillion, "Margaret"
 John Martyn, as part of the original song, "The Message"
 Kenneth McKellar on "Wild Conserves"
 Orthodox Celts, from the album Green Roses (1999)
 The Rankin Family taking it to number one in Canada. From the album The Rankin Family, 1989.
 Rapalje, "Rakish Paddies"
 Marie's Wedding is the basis for the guitar solo in "Skye," by Scottish band Runrig.
 Andy Stewart "Donald, Where's Your Troosers?"
 Alan Stivell, "Brian Boru"
 Richard Thompson, as an instrumental coda to "Nobody's Wedding" on Henry the Human Fly The Wiggles, "Hoop Dee Doo"
 Robert Wilson, "The Voice of Scotland"
 Ferocious Dog, on the album Ferocious Dog (2013) recorded a sequel to the song, Mairi's Wedding Part II
 Ferocious Dog, on the album From Without (2015) recorded a final sequel to the song, Mairi's Wedding Part III
 10,000 Maniacs, on the album Twice Told Tales (2015)
 Brogue, "Rhythm of the Celts", 2007
 The Tossers "Smash the windows" 2017

Use in Film

Jim Corr wrote two additional verses for the movie Passed Away. They are the only ones heard clearly in the movie.
 The song appears in the deleted scenes of the 3-disc special edition DVD of Peter Jackson's 2005 version of King Kong. It is heard while Naomi Watts and Jamie Bell are dancing on the deck of the tramp steamer Venture as it steams toward Skull Island. The song is not heard in the movie itself, however, so it is not clear whether its presence on the DVD is the result of film score composer James Newton Howard, who replaced Howard Shore, Shore himself, or the producer of the DVD.
The first two lines of "Mairi's Wedding" are quoted by the Scottish protagonist in the 2011 comedy film Salmon Fishing in the Yemen'', and an excerpt from the Brigham Phillips version of the song later plays in the soundtrack.

References

External links
 
 Standing Stones 
 Mudcat Cafe message board threads
 Video with Jimmy Shand playing and dancing (blocked by YouTube in some countries, including the United States)
 Information on origin and dance instructions

Wedding songs
Scottish folk songs
Outer Hebrides
Van Morrison songs
Marriage, unions and partnerships in Scotland